Love Productions is a UK-based television production company. Its cooking competition series The Great British Bake Off is among the most watched shows in the UK of its era.

History
Richard McKerrow and Anna Beattie formed Love Productions in 2004. In 2014, Sky acquired a 70% stake in Love Productions. In 2020, Sky bought the remaining shares making the studio a wholly owned subsidiary, seemingly part of a strategy to build a production empire. The acquisition came on the back of increased dividends for Sky 2019 of £22.7 million compared with £3.5 million in 2018; while two directors received £4.6 million in 2019, up from three directors receiving £1.4 million in 2018.

In 2020, the company's key "Bake off" series of productions has been postponed due to the COVID-19 pandemic which is likely to result in a loss of income in 2020/21.

Love Productions is also associated with the brands Love West, based in Bristol, and Love Productions USA.

Productions

The list of programmes produced by Love Productions include:

Controversies

Love Productions' best earning programme, The Great British Bake Off, had moved network channel from BBC Two to BBC One after three series due to its increasing popularity. Towards the end of series six, Love Productions's profits were decreasing; the company wished to remain on BBC One, however the £75 million asking price for three series was unacceptable to the BBC. Controversy arose as there were concerns the nature of the show would change with the move to Channel 4 and because most of the show's presenters did not make the move for the following series.

References

External links

Film production companies of the United Kingdom
Mass media companies established in 2004
Television production companies of the United Kingdom
2004 establishments in the United Kingdom
2004 establishments in England
Companies established in 2004